Cordylancistrus nephelion is a species of catfish in the family Loricariidae. It is native to South America, where it occurs in the Tuy River basin in Venezuela. It is known to inhabit areas with transparent water, moderate to strong flow, and a substrate of stone, gravel, or sand. The species reaches 12.9 cm (5.1 inches) SL.

References 

Ancistrini
Fish described in 2006